The Arwad bilingual, also the Arados inscription, is a Phoenician Greek inscription from Arwad, Syria.

It is the most recent dated inscription in the corpus of Phoenician inscriptions from the Phoenician homeland, and is the oldest inscription found on the island of Arwad. It is considered to be important evidence for the last times (Terminus post quem) when the Phoenician language was used in Phoenicia. The inscription is in the Louvre under item code AO 7676.

It is engraved on a limestone statue base measuring 23 x 42 x 50 cm, with a 9 cm deep embedding hole. It entered the Louvre in 1921, although this was not reported at the time, so its location was long unknown and Savignac's publication was not widely reviewed by epigraphers.

Gallery

Bibliography
 Françoise Briquel Chatonnet, 2013, Les inscriptions phénico-grecques et le bilinguisme des Phéniciens

References

Multilingual texts
Phoenician inscriptions
Arwad
Archaeological artifacts

Albert Trabaud
Raphaël Savignac